Raimond Aumann (born 12 October 1963) is a German former professional footballer who played  as a goalkeeper. His nickname is Balu (Germanized version of Baloo the bear in the Jungle Book).

Career
Aumann was born in Augsburg, West Germany. He played in the Bundesliga between 1982 and 1994. The first two years he was only reserve keeper of Bayern Munich (first choice was Jean-Marie Pfaff). In 1984, he became number 1 for the first time until his injury in November 1985. When Pfaff left Bayern Munich in 1988, Aumann became number 1. He was considered one of the best German goalkeepers at that time.

With Bayern Munich he won six German championships and twice the German Cup before he transferred in 1994 to Beşiktaş, where he was to help them to a 1995 league victory. He retired from football in November 1995.

Aumann played four times internationally in 1989 and 1990. He was a member of Germany's squad for the 1990 World Cup, but did not play in the tournament.

He is the supporters and fan club coordinator for Bayern Munich.

Honours
Bayern Munich
 DFB-Pokal: 1983–84, 1985–86
 Bundesliga (6): 1984–85, 1985–86, 1986–87, 1988–89, 1989–90, 1993–94
 European Cup: runner-up 1986–87
 DFL-Supercup: 1987, 1990

Beşiktaş
 Süper Lig: 1994–95

Germany
 World Cup: 1990

References

External links
 
 
 

1963 births
Living people
Sportspeople from Augsburg
German footballers
West German footballers
Footballers from Bavaria
Association football goalkeepers
Germany international footballers
Germany under-21 international footballers
FIFA World Cup-winning players
1990 FIFA World Cup players
Bundesliga players
Süper Lig players
FC Bayern Munich footballers
FC Bayern Munich II players
Beşiktaş J.K. footballers
FC Bayern Munich non-playing staff
German expatriate footballers
German expatriate sportspeople in Turkey
Expatriate footballers in Turkey